is a Japan-exclusive puzzle game for the Super Famicom released on April 14, 1995 by Nichibutsu. It stars an unnamed gnome who has to push boxes.

Gameplay 

The main objective of the game is to push the boxes and make a group of 3 boxes, once the group is made, the group on these boxes will pop out, once all the boxes disappeared, the games moves onto the next stage, if they did anything wrong, they could press L+R so that a jingle will play and the screen will fade onto white before resetting the stage.

The game supports up to four players via the Super Multitap accessory from Hudson Soft, the other players are colored differently, the multiplayer mode can choose one of the stages the game had.

The game also features a stage builder which allows the player to make their own stage, so that they could test it.

The game even features a sound test as well as a settings menu in which the player can either listen to music, sounds, or even change the options.

References

Notes 

1995 video games
Nihon Bussan games
Super Nintendo Entertainment System games
Video games developed in Japan
Multiplayer and single-player video games
Japan-exclusive video games
Puzzle video games
Super Nintendo Entertainment System-only games